Haaken Mathiesen may refer to:
 Haaken L. Mathiesen (1858–1930), Norwegian landowner and businessman
 Haaken C. Mathiesen (1827–1913), Norwegian landowner and businessman
 Haaken Severin Mathiesen (1926–1997), Norwegian landowner and businessman
 Haaken C. Mathiesen Jr. (1896–1975), Norwegian businessman